Daivathinte Swantham Cleetus is a 2013 Malayalam-language action comedy film directed by debutante director Marthandan and scripted by Benny P Nayarambalam. Set against the backdrop of theatre, Mammootty plays the title role of Cleetus, a theatre artiste. Honey Rose, Siddique, Suraj Venjaramoodu and P.Balachandran play prominent roles in the film. It was released on 12 September 2013.

Plot summary 
Daivathinte Swantham Cleetus tells the story of a "thug" named Cleetus who is asked by a parish priest, who does not know about his background, to play the role of Jesus Christ in a play. During the film, events in the life of Cleetus start to mirror events portrayed about Jesus' life in the Bible.

Cast 

 Mammootty as Cleetus
 Honey Rose as Lakshmi
 Siddique as Father Sunny Vadakkumthala
 Rejith Menon as Alex
 Suraj Venjaramoodu as Kunjachan
 Aju Varghese as Chinnan
 Eric Anil as Manikuttan, Lakshmi's son
 Sanam Shetty as Anna
 Abu Salim as Udumbu Salim
 Vinayakan as Sayippu
  Jubil Rajan P Dev as Podiyan
 Nandhu as Lakshmi's Father
 Mohan Jose as S.I Ittichan
 Kottayam Nazeer as Varghese
 Anoop Chandran as Makri Jose
 N. L. Balakrishnan as Kochappi
 Vijayaraghavan as Simon
 Jaise Jose as C.Krishnakumar
 Vishal Krishna as Jamon
 Ullas Pandalam
 Krishnaprasad
 Adinad Sasi
 Kailash as Jayakrishnan
 P. Balachandran as Raphael Vadakkumthala
  Maya Moushmi
 Thesni Khan as Kumbalangi Maria
 Manjusha Sajish 
 Anoop Krishnan as Shopkeeper

Reception

Critical Reception 
The film received mixed reviews upon release and it was a commercial flop.  Paresh C Palicha of Rediff.com rated the film 2/5 and said, "Fans of Mammootty will be happy with his performance, beginning with comedy, then moving to superhero action and culminating in emotionally intense scenes. But good acting is not enough to make up for a vapid plot and content." Padmakumar K. of Malayala Manorama rated the film 2.5/5 and said, "Just like any other director, debutant G Marthaandan has also made a film. He made it like a recipe with all the required ingredients in required measures. For a discerning connoisseur what it falls short of is the required taste." A critic from Oneindia.in rated the film 2.5/5 and said, "Daivathinte Swantham Cleetus can be regarded as a comedy entertainer. The first half of the movie is interesting". Aswin J. Kumar of The Times of India said, "Marthandan, as though overwhelmed by the sheer weight of the subject incorporates some light stuff, which eventually translates into poorly staged comic scenes." The reviewer criticised Mammootty's performance saying, "Mammootty carries off the thug and later the moralist with a palpable tiredness, which is worsened by a patchy make-up." Sharika C. of The Hindu said, "Tracing Cleetus’ transformation from evil to good, the film is a watchable fare. Does it mean resurrection for the superstar? Only, almost."

Box office 
The film was commercial flop. The film collected 4,6 at UK box office from 1st weekend, and 20,305 from 2nd weekend, and 14.66 lakhs from third weekend (final run).

Soundtrack

References 

https://www.imdb.com/title/tt3186958/reference

2013 films
2010s Malayalam-language films
2013 directorial debut films